Eva Hovenkamp (born 19 July 1996) is a Dutch sprinter. She competed in the women's 4 × 400 metres relay at the 2017 World Championships in Athletics.

References

External links

1996 births
Living people
Dutch female sprinters
World Athletics Championships athletes for the Netherlands
Place of birth missing (living people)
21st-century Dutch women